Anielin may refer to a number of places in Poland:

Kuyavian-Pomeranian Voivodeship (north-central Poland)
Anielin, Nakło County
Anielin, Włocławek County

Lublin Voivodeship (east Poland)
Anielin, Kraśnik County
Anielin, Puławy County

Łódź Voivodeship (central Poland)
Anielin, Kutno County
Anielin, Łask County
Anielin, Opoczno County
Anielin, Radomsko County
Anielin, Wieluń County
Anielin, Zgierz County

Masovian Voivodeship (east-central Poland)
Anielin, Ciechanów County
Anielin, Gostynin County
Anielin, Grójec County 
Anielin, Gmina Garbatka-Letnisko
Anielin, Gmina Magnuszew
Anielin, Płońsk County
Anielin, Radom County

Greater Poland Voivodeship (west-central Poland)
Anielin, Kalisz County
Anielin, Złotów County

See also 
Anielin Swędowski in Zgierz County, Łódź Voivodeship
Anielinek in Mińsk County, Masovian Voivodeship)
Anielino in Łobez County, West Pomeranian Voivodeship
Anieliny in Nakło County, Kuyavian-Pomeranian Voivodeship